Frank Kearse (born October 28, 1988) is a former American football defensive end. He was drafted by the Miami Dolphins in the seventh round of the 2011 NFL Draft. He played college football at Alabama A&M.

He has also played for the Carolina Panthers, Tennessee Titans, Dallas Cowboys, Washington Redskins, and New England Patriots.

Professional career

Miami Dolphins

The Miami Dolphins selected Kearse with the 231st overall pick of the 2011 NFL Draft.

Carolina Panthers
Played in six games with four starts at nose tackle for Carolina Panthers. Inactive during the beginning of the 2011 season. He was released on August 28, 2013.

Tennessee Titans
The Tennessee Titans signed Kearse to its practice squad on November 26, 2013.

Dallas Cowboys
Kearse was signed onto the Dallas Cowboys' roster from the Titans' practice squad on December 18, 2013. The Cowboys released him on May 12, 2014.

Washington Redskins
On May 17, 2014, Kearse signed with the Washington Redskins. In a Week 2 win against the Jacksonville Jaguars, Kearse recorded one of ten sacks the Redskins had on quarterback Chad Henne. In a Monday Night Football game against the Seattle Seahawks in Week 5, Kearse recorded a career-high five combined tackles, including a sack on quarterback Russell Wilson. In a Week 7 win against the Tennessee Titans, Kearse would record the team's only sack. He would finish the season with 15 total tackles, and 3 sacks.

Kearse was released on September 12, 2015 in order to promote linebacker Houston Bates from the team's practice squad, re-signed with the team on September 14. He was released again on September 19 in order to promote linebacker Terrance Plummer from the practice squad, but again re-signed on September 21. He was released for a third time on October 3, but re-signed again two days later.

New England Patriots
On March 11, 2016, Kearse signed with the New England Patriots.

On August 23, 2016, Kearse was released by the Patriots. On August 27, 2016, Kearse cleared waivers and was placed on injured reserve. On September 1, 2016, Kearse was released from the Patriots' injured reserve list with an injury settlement.

References

External links
Alabama A&M Bulldogs football bio 
Washington Redskins bio 
Carolina Panthers bio 

1988 births
Living people
Players of American football from Savannah, Georgia
American football defensive tackles
Alabama A&M Bulldogs football players
Miami Dolphins players
Carolina Panthers players
Tennessee Titans players
Dallas Cowboys players
Washington Redskins players
New England Patriots players